Gift is a 1993 experimental docudrama made by Perry Farrell and Perry's then-girlfriend, Casey Niccoli. The film prominently features Farrell's band Jane's Addiction.

Though released in 1993, the majority of filming took place three years earlier during the recording sessions of Ritual de lo Habitual in 1990.

Gift premiered to a limited audience on February 19, 1993, more than 18 months after Jane's Addiction officially dissolved, and was released to VHS by Warner Brothers on August 24, 1993. A laserdisc version was released in Japan, which features Japanese subtitles and obligatory censorship of visible genitalia. The film has achieved cult status among Jane's Addiction fans.

The following Jane's Addiction songs are featured in the soundtrack:
 "Ain't No Right"
 "Classic Girl"
 "Of Course"
 "Stop"
 "Three Days"

Rapper Ice-T, Body Count, and Jane's Addiction performed Sly and the Family Stone's "Don't Call Me Nigger, Whitey" in the film.

See also
Gothic rock

References

External links

1993 films
Jane's Addiction
1990s musical films